Oliver Genausch (born 1 June 1991) is a German footballer who plays as a forward for NOFV-Oberliga Süd club SC Freital.

References

External links

 

1991 births
Footballers from Dresden
Living people
German footballers
Association football forwards
Dynamo Dresden II players
FSV Zwickau players
FSV Wacker 90 Nordhausen players
VfB Auerbach players
Bischofswerdaer FV 08 players
3. Liga players
Regionalliga players
Oberliga (football) players